Lucien Lelong (11 October 1889 – 11 May 1958) was a French couturier who was prominent from the 1920s to the 1940s.

Career

Born in Paris as the son of Arthur Lelong, the owner of a fashion store, he trained at the Hautes Etudes de Commerciales in Paris and opened his fashion house in the early 1910s. The first Lelong designs were featured in Vogue magazine in 1913. Poor health caused the end of his career; Lelong retired from couture in August 1948, only continued his perfume business.

Lelong did not actually create the garments that bore his label. "He did not design himself, but worked through his designers," wrote Christian Dior, who was a member of the Lelong team from 1941 until 1946, during which time he created the collections in collaboration with Pierre Balmain. "Nevertheless," Dior continued, "in the course of his career as couturier his collections retained a style which was really his own and greatly resembled him." Other designers who worked for Lelong included Nadine Robinson and Hubert de Givenchy.

He remarried for the third time in 1954, with Sanda Dancovici, after having ceased his activity in 1952. They lived together near Biarritz in the commune of Anglet, at the Domaine de Courbois, which they restored at great expense. They play golf with the Duke of Windsor and hold receptions at the estate. They have a daughter, Christine, who remembers them. In 1949, after the closure of Maison Lucien Lelong, the first of the tailoring workshop, Germaine Devaucou, joined Jean Dessès.

Clientele
Among Lelong's clients were Marie Duhamel, Nora Barnacle wife of James Joyce, Jeanne Ternisien (wife of the banker Georges Nelze), the Duchess de la Rochefoucauld, Greta Garbo, Gloria Swanson, Colette, and Rose Kennedy.

Marriages
Lelong was married three times. His wives were:

Anne-Marie Audoy (1899-1935), whom he married in 1919 and divorced in 1927. They had one daughter, Nicole (born 1920), who became the directrice of her father's fashion house in 1947; she was also the namesake of his 1938 lipstick introduction, Nicole Pink. Anne-Marie Lelong, who returned to her maiden name after the Lelongs' divorce, married, in 1930, Baron Bertrand Clauzel.

Princess Natalie Paley (1905–1981), who had worked as a saleswoman in the Lelong perfume department, became one of its fashion models, and also worked as a movie actress. They married on 10 August 1927 and divorced in 1937. She was a daughter of Grand Duke Paul Alexandrovich of Russia and his morganatic wife, Olga Karnovich and married, in 1937, John Chapman Wilson. 

Sanda Annette Dancovici (1919-2001), an actress, whom he married in 1954; she was the daughter of Mircea Danovici. After Lelong's death she married, in 1959, French journalist Maurice Goudeket, the widower of Colette.

Death
Lelong died of a stroke in Anglet, France.

References

French fashion designers
1889 births
1958 deaths